Syngrapha angulidens is a moth of the family Noctuidae first described by Smith in 1891. It is found from Alaska south in the mountains to northern Oregon, western Nevada, Arizona and New Mexico and east to Colorado, western Wyoming, Montana and Alberta.

The wingspan is 30–34 mm. Adults are on wing from July to August depending on the location. There is one generation per year.

The larvae feed on Abies and Pseudotsuga species.

Subspecies
There are two recognised subspecies:
Syngrapha angulidens angulidens
Syngrapha angulidens excelsa

References

Plusiinae
Moths of North America
Moths described in 1891